Moakley is a surname. Notable people with the surname include:

Gertrude Moakley (1905–1998), American librarian and noted Tarot scholar.
Joe Moakley (1927–2001), American politician
John Francis Moakley (1863–1955), American track and field coach

See also
John Joseph Moakley United States Courthouse